Forest Lodge may refer to:

Australia
 Forest Lodge, New South Wales

United States
Forest Lodge (Upton, Maine), listed on the National Register of Historic Places in Oxford County, Maine
Forest Lodge (Namakagon, Wisconsin), listed on the National Register of Historic Places in Bayfield County, Wisconsin